Sandrine Vaucher   (born 20 August 1971) is a Swiss freestyle skier. She competed at the 1994 Winter Olympics in Lillehammer, in women's moguls.

References

External links 
 

1971 births
Living people
Swiss female freestyle skiers
Olympic freestyle skiers of Switzerland
Freestyle skiers at the 1994 Winter Olympics
20th-century Swiss women